The 1991 Kumuls tour was a rugby league tour by the Papua New Guinea team which took place from October to November 1991. It was the team's third tour to the Northern Hemisphere, and included nine games played in Great Britain and France. The team played one Test match each against the Great Britain and France national teams, which counted towards the 1989–1992 World Cup.

Touring squad
An initial 24-man squad was selected for the tour. 

Skerry Palanga was the team's head coach during the tour, with Tau Peruka, Rod Pearce and Joe Keviame appointed as tour managers.

Two additional players (Matmillo and Numapo) joined the tour in France, while three of the players selected (Moi, Sinemau and Uradok) returned home after the British leg.

Great Britain leg

Test

France leg

Test

References
General
 
Specific

External links
Kumuls Tour 1991 at rugbyleagueproject.org

Papua New Guinea national rugby league team tours
Rugby league tours of Great Britain
Rugby league tours of France
Papua New Guinea–United Kingdom relations
France–Papua New Guinea relations
Great Britain Lions tour
Kumuls tour
Kumuls tour
Kumuls tour